Bandinel is a surname. Notable people with the surname include:

David Bandinel (1575–1645)
James Bandinel (disambiguation), multiple people